is  Japanese manga series by . It was serialized in Weekly Shōnen Champion from 2008 to 2010.

Story
Goemon Ishikawa, the legendary king of thieves from the feudal era, has come to know that there is an important treasure being transported from the Imperial Palace to the Kamiyama mansion; an ancient artifact called "moon's melody box" (月詠みの箱). Surprised by the extreme measures taken by the guards of this treasure, his indomitable spirit aches to steal this rare item that once a year can grant one special wish to whoever possesses the box, but it will not be so easy to steal it. Even worse, once it is opened, it will be harder to deal with the unusual contents of the box.

Characters

Goemon's party
 Ishikawa Goemon (石川 五右衛門) – The amazing thief with amazing powers like "the thunder scream" and "the wind dance". He is the son of the Chinese master So Souken and speaks in an odd American dialect.
 Kaguya (かぐや) – She is trapped in the "Moon's melody box" and holds a mysterious power. She is 704-year-old, yet she eternally resembles a 5-year-old girl. Her motif is "Princess Kaguya" (かぐや姫, Kaguya-hime). She is the main character in The Tale of the Bamboo Cutter.
 Tokietsu Sōta (時越 速太) – He fell from a black hole when Kaguya granted Goemon his wish. He is a young boy from the year 2009.
 Tanaka Kintarō (田中 金太郎) – A progeny of Kintarō (Sakata no Kintoki). He is 16 years old and has dreadlocks and possesses herculean strength.
 Sakata-san (坂田さん) – Kintarō's partner, who is a giant panda.

Oda clan
 Oda Nobunaga (織田 信長) – A fearsome Sengoku period warlord called "The Satan" (魔王 Maō). He is the Oda clan's leader.
 Shibata Katsuie (柴田 勝家) – A general of the Oda clan. He is part—human and part-ogre.
 Takigawa Kazumasu (滝川 一益) – A general of the Oda clan. He is a ninja of Kōga-ryū.
 Maeda Toshiie (前田 利家) – A general of the Oda clan.
 Akechi Mitsuhide (明智 光秀) – A general of the Oda clan.
 Hashiba Hideyoshi (羽柴 秀吉) – A general of the Oda clan.

Other characters 
 Saitō Dōsan (斎藤 道三) – The Saitō clan's leader who can spout fire. 
 Izumono Okuni (出雲 阿国) – The amazing thief known as "Lady Panther". She is 17 years old.
 Momochi Sandayū (百地 三太夫) – Iga-ryū ninja leader and Goemon's teacher.

Manga volumes 
 Shōnen Champion Comics Label

References 

2008 manga
Shōnen manga
Akita Shoten manga